Caisis is an open-source, web-based, patient data management system that integrates research with patient care. The system is freely distributed to promote the collection of standard, well structured data suitable for research and multi-institution collaboration.

History 
Caisis was designed around structured chronological patient histories which could be displayed to clinicians and processed by computer algorithms.
The system was initiated in the Department of Urology at Memorial Sloan–Kettering Cancer Center in 2002 and has been actively developed by BioDigital Systems and a number of other institutions worldwide. It is released under the GNU General Public License (GPL) and is entirely web based; written mainly in C#, HTML, and JavaScript it runs on the .Net Framework.
The installer, source code and documentation are available from its website. Although it is widely used in cancer research the framework allows rapid adoption for collecting data on a multitude of disease states.

Features 
Open source freely available web application
Clinical practice and research activities combined to
improve data quality and efficiency
Designed to be easily extended to new diseases
Framework allows quick addition of new fields and
data collection using electronic forms
Clinical documentation integrated via paper and
web-based forms (eForms)
Integrated protocol management module
Integrated specimen banking module
Integrated project tracking module
Data export tools and disease specific algorithms
Plugin interface for user friendly tools (e.g. PSA graph, file upload tool)
Longitudinal follow-up automation
HIPAA compliant robust security features

Concept 
Caisis has been developed to allow the system to evolve and adapt to the evolving landscape of clinical research. As a framework, it is easy for developers to extend Caisis by adding new fields and tables, plugin features, and new modules with standalone functionality. New functionality is added to support the primary
goal of Caisis: to capture the patient's clinical "story". This approach provides users and clinicians with work flow driven interfaces that allow data capture to occur at the point of service.

Capturing data in the structured, Caisis relational data model, will facilitate the generation of large clean datasets for multi-institution collaborative research.

Other modules 
 Specimen Banking
Specimen tracking that includes details about specimen handling, tests, and storage
Interface to define storage setup
Specimen transfer tracking
Specimen search based on clinical or pathological details
 Protocol / Clinical Trials Management
 Patient study calendar that integrates the patient schedule and data entry
 Serious adverse event reportingOutcomes management for Biomarker, Soft Tissue, and Bone response
 Data entry customization by protocol
 Registration and Eligibility tracking

 This is a third partly tool, developed by The Breast Cancer Tissue Bank BCTB in Australia, for checking data accuracy in an efficient way.

References

External links 
 
 Documentation

Health care software
Cancer research